Bruce Gregory Friedrich (born August 7, 1969) is co-founder and president of The Good Food Institute (GFI), a Y Combinator funded non-profit that promotes plant- and cultivated meat alternatives to conventional animal meat. He is also a co-founder of the alternative protein venture capital firm New Crop Capital. Friedrich previously worked for PETA and Farm Sanctuary.

Early life and education
Friedrich was born in West Lafayette, Indiana on August 7, 1969. In 1987, he graduated from Norman High School in Norman, Oklahoma. In 1996, Friedrich graduated Phi Beta Kappa from Grinnell College with a B.A. in English, Economics, and Religion. He holds degrees from Johns Hopkins University and the London School of Economics, and received his J.D. degree from Georgetown University Law Center, graduating magna cum laude, Order of the Coif.

Career 
Friedrich served as Director of Policy for four years at Farm Sanctuary. Prior to that, he worked at PETA for 15 years. As Head of Public Campaigns, he led many of the organization's highest-profile campaigns, including one from the early 2000s when he and PETA tried to convince the Green Bay Packers football team to change its name, which had originated from a defunct meat packing plant in the Green Bay area, which failed.

Friedrich was recruited by Mercy For Animals to launch The Good Food Institute (GFI) with the goal of transforming the food system by promoting price- and taste-competitive alternatives to animal products. In recognition for his work at GFI, Friedrich was named an "American Food Hero" by the Eating Well magazine in 2021.

Friedrich is a co-founder of New Crop Capital; a venture capital firm for funding the development of alternative proteins.

Friedrich is a TED fellow; in 2019, he gave a TED Talk that has since been viewed more than 2.3 million times and translated into more than 30 languages arguing that plant-based and cultivated meat have the potential to transform the global meat industry, preventing climate change, mitigating pandemic risk, and decreasing the prevalence of antibiotic resistant pathogens.

Philanthropy 
An effective altruism advocate, Friedrich is a member of Giving What We Can, a community of people who have pledged to donate a portion of their income to effective charities.

Personal life
Friedrich is Christian and has been vegan since 1987. He is married to Alka Chandna, who works for PETA.

Works

See also

 Cultured meat
 Meat analogue

References

External links

 Bruce Friedrich on The Good Food Institute's website
 TED Talk: The next global agricultural revolution (2019)
Interviews with Bruce Friedrich:
 Making Sense podcast with Sam Harris (2021)
 80,000 Hours podcast (2018)

1969 births
Living people
Alumni of the London School of Economics
American animal rights activists
American chief executives of food industry companies
American food company founders
American nonprofit businesspeople
American veganism activists
American venture capitalists
Georgetown University Law Center alumni
Grinnell College alumni
Johns Hopkins University faculty
People associated with effective altruism
People for the Ethical Treatment of Animals personnel
People from West Lafayette, Indiana
TED Fellows